Pseudopostega attenuata is a moth of the family Opostegidae. It is probably a rather widespread species in the South American lowland tropics. The species is known from Costa Rica, north-western Brazil and south-western Ecuador.

The length of the forewings is 1.8–2.2 mm. Adults have been found from February to June in Costa Rica and Brazil and in January in Ecuador.

Etymology
The species name is derived from the Latin attenuatus (meaning drawn out, tapered) in reference to the relatively elongate, tapered vinculum characteristic of the male genitalia of this species.

External links
A Revision of the New World Plant-Mining Moths of the Family Opostegidae (Lepidoptera: Nepticuloidea)

Opostegidae
Moths described in 2007